Arnold is an unincorporated community in Morgan County, Illinois, United States.

References

Unincorporated communities in Morgan County, Illinois
Unincorporated communities in Illinois